Mountain Tracks: Volume 1 is a progressive bluegrass live album by the Yonder Mountain String Band. It was released in 2001 by Frog Pad Records.

The first in a growing series of live releases, it was recorded over the course of two days at the Fox Theatre in Boulder, Colorado.

Track listing 

 "Sharecropper's Son" (Carter Stanley) – 3:06
 "Keep on Going" (Jeff Austin) – 12:05
 "My Gal" (Traditional) – 5:52
 "Snow on the Pines" (Austin) – 14:36
 "Whiskey Before Breakfast" (Traditional) – 3:02
 "If You're Ever in Oklahoma > Elzic's Farewell > If You're Ever in Oklahoma" (J. J. Cale, Traditional) – 18:06

Personnel

Yonder Mountain String Band 

 Dave Johnston – banjo, vocals
 Jeff Austin – mandolin, vocals
 Ben Kaufmann – bass, vocals
 Adam Aijala – guitar, vocals

Technical 

 Michael R. Everett – artwork
 David Glasser – mastering
 Chris Mickle – engineer, editing, assistant producer
 James Tuttle – mixing
 Yonder Mountain String Band – arranger

References

External links 
 Yonder Mountain String Band Official Homepage

Yonder Mountain String Band albums
2001 live albums
Frog Pad Records live albums